Gorseddau are meetings or communities of bards.

Gorseddau may also refer to:

Gorseddau, Gwynedd, a village in North Wales
Gorseddau quarry, a former slate quarry in North Wales
Gorseddau Tramway, a former  gauge railway in North Wales
Gorseddau Junction and Portmadoc Railway, a former  gauge railway in North Wales